Georg Weber may refer to:

 Georg Weber (historian) (1808-1888), German historian
 Georg F. Weber (born 1962), cancer researcher

See also 
 George Weber (disambiguation)
 George Webber (disambiguation)